Ottadalen is a valley in the municipalities of Skjåk, Lom, Vågå, and Sel in Innlandet county, Norway.

The valley is one of the side valleys that branch off of the large Gudbrandsdalen valley. It lies on the northern edge of Jotunheimen National Park. Historically, the Ottadalen has been widely used as a transportation artery between western and eastern Norway through the Breidalen valley in Skjåk to Stryn, through the Breidalskrysset to Stranda, along the Jostedalsbreen glacier to the Jostedalen valley and Luster, and across the Sognefjellet to Sogn. There is also a road from Vågå, through Jotunheimen to Fagernes. 

The Otta River flows through the valley. The Otta River begins in the municipality of Skjåk and flows into lake Vågåvatnet. Exiting Vågåvatnet at Vågåmo, it continues its journey through the valley, leaving the municipality of Vågå to meet the Gudbrandsdalslågen river at the town of Otta in the municipality of Sel.

Reinheimen National Park, which consists of much of the Tafjordfjella mountain range, includes the reindeer habitat in the northern part of the Ottadalen valley.

See also
Otta seal

References

External links
Fjuken, local newspaper for the Ottadalen area
Otta website

Lom, Norway
Sel
Skjåk
Vågå
Valleys of Innlandet